Retardation  is the act or result of delaying; the extent to which anything is retarded or delayed; that which retards or delays.

Retardation or retarded or similar may refer to:

Medicine and biology
 Mental retardation, also known as intellectual disability, a disorder characterized by significantly impaired cognitive functioning and deficits in adaptive behaviors
 Psychomotor retardation, a slowing-down of thought and a reduction of physical movements in an individual
 A form of heterochrony, able to cause effects such as neoteny, retention by adults of traits previously seen only in the young

Physics and engineering
 Retardation factor, in chromatography, the fraction of an analyte in the mobile phase of a chromatographic system
 Retarded potential, in electrodynamics,  electromagnetic potentials generated by time-varying electric current or charge distributions in the past
 Retarded time, time when an electromagnetic field began to propagate from a point in a charge distribution to an observer
 Retardation time
 Retardation, in telegraphy, a kind of distortion of signal pulses; see law of squares

Music
 Retardation (music), a suspension that resolves upward instead of downward
 "Retarded" (song), a 1990 single by the band The Afghan Whigs

Other uses
 A process used in proofing (baking technique)
 Retard (pejorative), a pejorative term for someone with a mental disability

See also
 Retarder (disambiguation)
 Get Retarded (disambiguation)